Ju Hyo-sim (born 21 June 1998) is a North Korean female international football player.

International goals

Under 16

Under-19

National team

Honours 
North Korea
Winner
 EAFF Women's East Asian Cup: 2015

External links 
 

1998 births
Living people
North Korean women's footballers
North Korea women's international footballers
Women's association football midfielders
Footballers at the 2018 Asian Games
Asian Games competitors for North Korea